Chinna Cinema is a 2013 Indian Telugu-language romantic comedy film by Ajay Kambhampati as his directorial debut, and starring Arjun Kalyan, Komal Jha, Ravi Varma, Pradeep Shakti, L.B. Sriram, Surya, and Dr. M. Balayya with music by Praveen Lakkaraju.

Plot
Ramu (Arjun Kalyan) lands in the USA with the dream of making much money with little effort. He stays with his friends and works at a local Indian grocery store owned by B. Jay (Mahesh Sriram) and operated by B. Jay's brother-in-law S. Jay (Karthik Srinivas). He takes an instant liking towards Janaki (Sumona Chanda) when he sees her the first time. Ramu is motivated to earn and send more money to his father Narayana (Surya) for building a new home. The new home is actually for an orphanage ("Raamaalayam") that is run by an old man, Bapiraju (Dr. M. Balayya). A certain part of the movie has few episodes with a flashback. Komal Jha features as Damayanthi. a Nartaki (dancer) of the 1950s in a village.

Cast

 Arjun Kalyan as Ramudu
 Sumona Chanda as Janaki 
 Komal Jha as Damayanthi
 Ravi Varma
 Pradeep Shakti
 L.B. Sriram
 Surya as Narayana
 Dr. M. Balayya as Bapiraju
 Vennela Kishore as Sri
 Prithvi as Daange
 Thagubothu Ramesh
 Ravi Varma as Cowboy Krishna
 Mahesh Sriram as B. Jay 
 Karthik Srinivas as S. Jay
 RJ Ghajini as Film director
 Siddhanth
 Raghunadh
 Srini Kolla
 Gautam Raju 
 Sudarshanam
 Nagaraju
 Sandhya Janak

Reception
Times of India panned the film, offering that while filmmaker Ajay Kambhampati "chose an interesting premise - Daanam Chese Vaadiki Swartham Undakudadu (A philanthropist must not have a selfish motto)", he "miserably failed to translate the idea into cinema. In trying to package a commercially entertaining film with an underlying philosophical message, the movie ends up being neither entertaining nor profound."  Expanding, they offered that the film "is a predictable fare that has revenge plot - often seen in Telugu films and doesn't offer anything new. The element of surprise is missing from the narration and it meanders aimlessly."  They noted that in a revenge-drama "the protagonist's moves to counter goons should be meticulously etched but that was badly missing," and offered that the plot line was illogical, the film's sequences looked uninteresting, and the romance between Ramudu (Arjun Kalyan) and Janaki (Sumona Chanda) was dull and failed to make an impression.

Filmibeat noted filmmaker AK Kambhampati's "passion, dedication and hard work are clearly visible in his debut directorial venture", and while he had "an amazing grip over" the film's tempo, and despite the film having a unique theme and a beautiful message, he failed to execute it on the screen. It was granted that the film's first half offered racy narration, "with a couple romantic songs and a few rib-tickling comedy sequences", but it hit rough patches during the second half "where its narration turns damn slow and a few dragging scenes might even bore the viewers", working to its detriment. Arjun Kalyan, the lead, delivered a decent performance, but he has still long way to go to prove his metal.

123Telugu offered that the film had a good concept but a bad execution. Pluses included the film's concept "of ‘ selfless donations ‘ and charity without expecting anything in return have been dealt with nicely." Actor  Dr. M. Balayya was praised for delivering "a classy and restrained performance".  Newcomer Arjun Kalyan  was "ok as the male lead", but needs to become relaxed and more comfortable in future roles.  Vennela Kishore was entertaining in his role of movie reviewer, and RJ Ghajini was god in his role of an aspiring film director.  Comedy scenes in the film's first half were good and "the song ‘Puttadi Bomma’ was shot beautifully."  Film deficits include newcomer Sumona Chanda being a poor casting choice for the female lead, as it was felt "she does not have the kind of face that appeals to Telugu viewers."   Further, the senior actors led by Goutham Raju were irritating and their comedy scenes seemed poorly written.

Soundtrack 
In January 2013, it was announced that Chinna Cinema was "gearing up for audio launch".  Music is composed by Praveen Lakkaraju, with various song lyrics by Chakravarthula, SreeJo, Srinivasa Mouli, and K.S.M. Phanindra.  Audio launch was February 9, 2013.

 USA, performed by Monica & Praveen Lakkaraju
 Puthadi Bomma performed by Suchitra & Sreenivas Josyula
 Alai Vachi performed by Divya Devunhalli & Prasad Thallam
 Ramugadu performed by Sahiti & Praveen Lakkaraju
 Hari Lo Ranga Hari performed by S. P. Balasubrahmanyam
 Chinna Cinema performed by Thagubothu Ramesh & Vennela Kishore

References

2013 films
2013 romantic comedy films
Indian romantic comedy films
2010s Telugu-language films